"Mmm Mmm Mmm Mmm" is a song by Canadian rock band Crash Test Dummies, and written by its singer Brad Roberts. It was released in October 1993 as the lead single from their second album, God Shuffled His Feet (1993). The song was released to positive critical reviews and commercial success worldwide. It reached number four on the United States' Billboard Hot 100 and topped the national charts of Australia, Belgium, Denmark, Germany, Iceland, Lithuania, Norway, Sweden, and the US Modern Rock Tracks chart. It also became a top-five hit on both the UK Singles Chart and the all-genre US Billboard Hot 100 (their only major hit on that chart to date), but in the band's native Canada, it stalled at number 14 on the RPM Top Singles chart. In later years, however, the song made its way to several lists of bad songs.

Content
Each of the three verses describes the isolation and suffering of a different child, two of whom have a physical abnormality. In the first verse, a boy is injured in a car accident and misses school for an extended period; when he returns to class, his hair has changed color from black to bright white. In the second verse, a girl refuses to change clothes in the presence of other girls due to the birthmarks that cover her body. The third child is a boy whose parents require that he come directly home after school; during services at their church, they "shake and lurch" across the floor. During a 2010 live performance for the Dutch radio station Kink FM, Roberts whispered "Pentecostal" during the third verse, suggesting this is the denomination of the church.

Most of the lyrics are based on childhood experiences of Roberts. For example, he was in a few serious car crashes as a child, which inspired the first verse; he has a birthmark at the base of his spine which made him a bullying target as a child, inspiring the second verse; and he knew a girl who went to a Pentecostal church, where members were known to speak in tongues, inspiring the third. He got the idea of a boy's hair turning from black into bright white from stories he had heard about this phenomenon happening to survivors of perilous experiences, including a man who almost went over the Niagara Falls, and his great uncle who fought in Japan in World War II and heard Japanese soldiers yelling threats in broken English.

An alternative version sometimes performed at live concerts replaced the third verse with one concerning a boy whose mother disposed of his tonsils after a tonsillectomy, thus depriving him of the possibility of bringing them to show and tell.

Reception

Critical reception
Larry Flick from Billboard called the song a "shimmering acoustic/rock jewel". He added that it "marries a worldwise vocal with a textured arrangement that is chock full of aural goodies. Given justice (and promotional tender loving care), this one will soon blossom into the across-the-board smash it should be." Dave Sholin from the Gavin Report stated, "If there's an Alternative outlet in town, you can hear how great this sounds on the air." Robert Hilburn from Los Angeles Times wrote, "The exaggerated vocal narration makes this sound like a novelty, but it is a deceptively original work about how kids are often tormented for falling outside the norm." In his weekly UK chart commentary, James Masterton joked, "The unusual song probably holds the record for the longest song title not to include a vowel in the title." Pan-European magazine Music & Media commented, "It takes one weirdo to dig another, so Dummy Brad Roberts and "Talking Head" Harrison make an ideal pair. This ballad is deceivingly ACE until you listen to the lyrics." Alex Kadis from Smash Hits said it is "a truly beautiful masterpiece". Another editor, Mark Frith, gave it one out of five. Troy J. Augusto from Variety declared it as "an unlikely yet quite hummable pop tune." The track received a nomination for a Grammy Award for Best Pop Performance by a Duo or Group with Vocal, which it lost to "I Swear" by All-4-One.

Retrospective reception
Although highly successful when it was released, "Mmm Mmm Mmm Mmm" has since been frequently included on lists of bad songs. The song was number 15 on VH1's 50 Most Awesomely Bad Songs Ever, named by Rolling Stone as the "15th Most Annoying Song", and ranked at number 31 on Blender's list of the "50 Worst Songs Ever". The Huffington Post Canada ranked this song at number 29 on its list of "50 Worst Canadian Songs Ever". Contrasting, VH1 named "Mmm Mmm Mmm Mmm" as the 31st greatest one-hit wonder of the 1990s in 2011.

In a 1994 essay in which he makes the case that modern life is better than life in the past, humorist P.J. O'Rourke writes, "Even the bad things are better than they used to be. Bad music, for instance, has gotten much briefer. Wagner's Ring Cycle takes four days to perform while 'Mmm Mmm Mmm Mmm' by the Crash Test Dummies lasts little more than three minutes."

In 1994, "Weird Al" Yankovic parodied the song as the lead-off single for his compilation box set Permanent Record: Al in the Box after his record label insisted he record a new song to promote it. The parody, titled "Headline News", combined the music of the original song with new lyrics about three popular news stories from the preceding months. He also produced and starred in a nearly frame-for-frame parody of the original song's music video, featuring several celebrities playing the parts of those referred to in the lyrics.

In The Venture Bros., the Pirate Captain plays a rendition of the song, calling it "an old pirate dirge", at Jonas Venture Jr.'s funeral, to Rusty's annoyance.

Chart performance
Outside their home country of Canada, the single became the band's most successful song, reaching number four in the United States and number two in the United Kingdom—the group's biggest hit in both countries. It also reached number one on the Modern Rock Chart in the United States and in Australia, Belgium, Denmark, Germany, Iceland, Norway, and Sweden.

While the Crash Test Dummies had six singles reach the Canadian top ten, "Mmm Mmm Mmm Mmm" was not one of them, instead stalling at number 14.

Music video
The accompanying music video for "Mmm Mmm Mmm Mmm" was directed by Dale Heslip and premiered in October 1993. It sets the song's lyrics as the script for a series of one-act plays performed by schoolchildren. Throughout, the scenes of the performance are intercut with scenes of the Crash Test Dummies performing the song at stage side.

All three one-act plays included nicknames for their lead characters, to provide Heslip with easy references:
 The first featured a kid nicknamed "Whitey"
 The second pitted "Blotchy" against "Bratty Kids", who Heslip thought lived up to their nickname; Blotchy's marks are covered with a long cape she wears throughout, whereas the "Bratty Kids" wear deerstalker hats and carry magnifying glasses
 The third had, as its focus, a "Reluctant Boy"

These nicknames were all revealed in an installment of Pop-Up Video. The same installment also revealed that Brad Roberts had decided to hum, rather than actually sing, the refrain of "Mmm Mmm Mmm Mmm" because humming the refrain sounded more resigned to him and that he never wrote lyrics for it.

The music video for "Mmm Mmm Mmm Mmm" was published on YouTube in March 2018. It has amassed over 32 million views as of January 2023.

Track listings
 CD maxi
 "Mmm Mmm Mmm Mmm" – 3:53
 "Here I Stand Before Me" – 3:07
 "Superman's Song" (live from the US public radio program Mountain Stage)

 7-inch single
 "Mmm Mmm Mmm Mmm" – 3:53
 "Here I Stand Before Me" – 3:07

 US single
 "Mmm Mmm Mmm Mmm" – 3:53
 "Superman's Song" (album version) – 4:31
 "How Does a Duck Know?" – 3:42

 Cassette single
Features cardboard picture liner
 "Mmm Mmm Mmm Mmm"
 "Here I Stand Before Me"

Charts

Weekly charts

Year-end charts

Certifications

Release history

References

1990s ballads
1993 singles
1993 songs
Arista Records singles
Bertelsmann Music Group singles
Crash Test Dummies songs
Number-one singles in Australia
Number-one singles in Belgium
Number-one singles in Denmark
Number-one singles in Germany
Number-one singles in Iceland
Number-one singles in Norway
Number-one singles in Sweden
RCA Records singles
Rock ballads
Song recordings produced by Jerry Harrison
Songs about children
Songs written by Brad Roberts